Gabriela A. Liz (born December 31, 1961) is a retired female field hockey player from Argentina. She was the captain of the Women's National Team that finished in seventh place at the 1988 Summer Olympics in Seoul, South Korea. Liz twice won a gold medal at the Pan American Games (1987 and 1991), and ended her international career after the 1998 Women's Hockey World Cup.

References 
  sports-reference
  santafedeportivo

External links
 

1961 births
Living people
Argentine female field hockey players
Las Leonas players
Field hockey players at the 1988 Summer Olympics
Olympic field hockey players of Argentina
Pan American Games gold medalists for Argentina
Pan American Games medalists in field hockey
Field hockey players at the 1987 Pan American Games
Field hockey players at the 1991 Pan American Games
Medalists at the 1987 Pan American Games
Medalists at the 1991 Pan American Games
20th-century Argentine women